Honduras competed at the 2009 World Championships in Athletics from August 15-23 in Berlin.

Team selection

Track and road events

Results

Men

Women

References

External links
Official competition website

Nations at the 2009 World Championships in Athletics
World Championships in Athletics
Honduras at the World Championships in Athletics